The Carolina King Giants are a semi-pro Puerto Rican football team based in Carolina, Puerto Rico, competing in the Puerto Rico American Football League (PRAFL).

History

Club Culture

Carolina Warriors

AFAPR Sub-23
It is the club's U-23 team that participates in the American Football League of Puerto Rico 2nd division of Puerto Rican American football league pyramid, its goal is to develop players with potential so that they can eventually make the jump to either the PRAFL team.

Record

Year-by-year

References

2014 establishments in Puerto Rico
Puerto Rico American Football League teams
Carolina, Puerto Rico